Sauerbrey or Sauerbrei or Sauerbreij may refer to:

 Ellen Sauerbrey (born 1937), American politician
 Frank Sauerbrey, German ski jumper
 Günter Sauerbrey (1933–2003), German physicist and researcher
 Katherine Sauerbrey (born 1997), German cross-country skier
 Nicolien Sauerbreij (born 1979), Dutch snowboarder
 Rudolf Sauerbrei (1919–2007), German Major, highly decoracted in World War II
 Ulf Sauerbrey (born 1961), German rower

See also
 Sauerbrey equation, in quartz crystal microbalance invented in 1959
 Sauerbrey constant
 Sauerbrey layer